Peter Petzold (born 1 June 1949) is a German former weightlifter. He competed in the men's middle heavyweight event at the 1976 Summer Olympics.

References

External links
 

1949 births
Living people
German male weightlifters
Olympic weightlifters of East Germany
Weightlifters at the 1976 Summer Olympics
People from Sächsische Schweiz-Osterzgebirge
World Weightlifting Championships medalists
Sportspeople from Saxony